Mark Sloan may refer to:

Mark Sloan (curator) (born 1957), American artist, curator and museum director
Mark Sloan (wrestler) (born 1978), British professional wrestler
Mark Sloan (Diagnosis: Murder), lead character in U.S. TV series Diagnosis: Murder, played by Dick Van Dyke
Mark Sloan (Grey's Anatomy), character in U.S. TV series Grey's Anatomy, played by Eric Dane